The Costa Rica national football team represents Costa Rica in men's international football. The national team is administered by the Costa Rican Football Federation (FEDEFUTBOL), the governing body for football in Costa Rica. It has been a member of the Fédération Internationale de Football Association (FIFA) since 1927, the Confederation of North, Central American and Caribbean Association Football (CONCACAF) since 1961, and a member of the Central American Football Union (UNCAF) since 1990.

Costa Rica is the most successful national football team from the region of Central America. Winning three CONCACAF Championships (1963, 1969, 1989) and leading the Copa Centroamericana tournament with four championships up until 2017, when it was absorbed into the CONCACAF Nations League. Costa Rica is the only national team in Central America to have played in six FIFA World Cup editions. Costa Rica's national football team has the all-time highest average Football Elo Ranking in Central America with 1597.1, and the all-time highest Football Elo Ranking in Central America, with 1806 in 2014.

Since the late 1980s, the team has continuously been visible as a solidly competitive side, with a prominent performance in the 1990 FIFA World Cup in Italy, making it to the knockout stage in their debut after finishing second in their group during the first phase, below Brazil. They also qualified for the 2002 and 2006 FIFA World Cups.

In 2014, Costa Rica achieved their best performance in history by finishing first in their group that consisted of three former World Cup champions: Uruguay, Italy, and England. During the round 16 they defeated Greece 5–3 via a penalty shoot-out after a 1–1 draw. Moreover, during their match against the Greek team, Keylor Navas saved more than 15 shots. They reached the quarter-finals for the first time but were defeated by the Netherlands, also in a penalty shoot-out (3–4) after a scoreless draw on 5 July. Both their 2018 and 2022 World Cup campaigns ended in a fourth place group stage exit, with their only points coming from a 2–2 draw against Switzerland in 2018 and a 1–0 win over Japan in 2022.

History

Early history

The national team made its debut in the Independence Centenary Games held in Guatemala City in September 1921, winning their first game 7–0 against El Salvador. In the final, Costa Rica defeated 6–0 Guatemala to claim the trophy.

Costa Rica's team in the late 1940s acquired the nickname "The Gold Shorties". Throughout the '50s and '60s, they were the second strongest team in the CONCACAF zone behind Mexico, finishing runners-up in World Cup qualifying in the 1958, 1962 and 1966 qualifiers. Stars of the side during this period included Ruben Jimenez, Errol Daniels, Leonel Hernandez and Edgar Marin. However, Costa Rica was not able to utilize this advantage, hence failed to reach any World Cup at that decade.

At the end of the 1960s their fortunes declined as Guatemala, Honduras, El Salvador, Haiti, Trinidad & Tobago and Canada rose in prominence.

1980s
Costa Rica failed to qualify for any of the World Cups in the 1970s and 1980s, and did not reach the final round of the CONCACAF qualifying until the 1986 qualifiers.

They participated in two consecutive Summer Olympic Games, in Moscow 1980 and in Los Angeles 1984. In 1980, Costa Rica competed against Yugoslavia, Finland and Iraq in Group D, losing 3–2, 3–0 and 3–0 respectively. In Los Angeles, the Ticos lost 3–0 against the United States, and 4–1 against Egypt, but beat a strong Italy team, which included Walter Zenga, Pietro Vierchowod, Franco Baresi and Aldo Serena, 1–0 with a goal by the midfielder Enrique Rivers.

1990 World Cup

Costa Rica won the 1989 CONCACAF Championship to qualify for the finals of a World Cup for the first time. In the first round of the qualifiers, they beat Panama 3–1 on aggregate after a 2–0 away victory in the second leg, with goals by Juan Arnoldo Cayasso and Hernán Medford. They were drawn against Mexico in the second round, but advanced automatically when their opponents were disqualified for youth player age tampering.

Costa Rica started the final qualifying group stage with a home victory and an away defeat against both Guatemala and the United States. They drew 1–1 with Trinidad and Tobago and then beat the same opponents 1–0 at home with a goal by Cayasso. They achieved an important away win, 4–2 against El Salvador at the Estadio Cuscatlán, with goals from Carlos Mario Hidalgo, Cayasso and a double from Leonidas Flores, before beating El Salvador 1–0 in San José with a goal from Pastor Fernández. They finished first in the group table, ahead of the United States on goal difference.

Italy 1990, or Italia 90, is considered a seminal moment in Costa Rican football history. In particular, the players are notable for being primarily non-professionals, in that most players had other jobs and did not make a living playing football. Due to the success of the team during the World Cup, a number of the squad members went on to success in Costa Rican football (and international, in the case of Conejo).

Placed in Group C at the World Cup finals, Costa Rica began by beating Scotland 1–0 thanks to another goal by Cayasso. Although they lost to Brazil by the same score, they came from behind to beat Sweden 2–1 in their final group match to reach the knockout stages. There, they lost 4–1 to Czechoslovakia, for whom Tomáš Skuhravý scored a hat-trick.

2002 World Cup
The Ticos won the qualification for the 2002 World Cup held in South Korea and Japan. During the qualifiers, Costa Rica were coached by the Brazilian, Gílson Nunes, and then by the naturalised Brazilian, Alexandre Guimarães. The first qualifying group stage began with an unexpected 2–1 defeat to Barbados. After this humiliation, Costa Rica beat the United States 2–1 at the Ricardo Saprissa Stadium, with goals from Rolando Fonseca and Hernán Medford. They then beat Guatemala 2–1 in the Estadio Alejandro Morera Soto, with two goals from Paulo Wanchope and Barbados 3–0 at the Ricardo Saprissa, with goals from Jafet Soto, Fonseca and Medford. A draw against the United States and a 2–1 defeat to Guatemala forced Costa Rica into a play-off against Guatemala in Miami. Costa Rica won 5–2 with two goals from Fonseca and one each from Wanchope, Reynaldo Parks and Jafeth Soto.

Costa Rica displayed fine attacking form during the final qualifying round, beginning with a 2–2 draw against Honduras at the Ricardo Saprissa, with goals from Fonseca and Rodrigo Cordero, and a 3–0 defeat of Trinidad and Tobago at the Morera Soto. Their only loss in this round came when the United States beat them 1–0. Costa Rica bounced back with a 2–1 win against Mexico in Mexico City, a match known as the Aztecazo, with goals from Fonseca and Medford. Further wins over Jamaica, Honduras and Trinidad and Tobago took Costa Rica to the brink of qualification, which they sealed with an emotional 2–0 win against the United States in the Saprissa, with a double from Fonseca.

In the finals, Costa Rica were drawn into Group C with Brazil, China, and Turkey. Their campaign started in Gwangju, where the Ticos beat China 2–0. In their second game against Turkey in Incheon, Winston Parks scored an 86th-minute goal to earn a 1–1 draw. Against Brazil, Costa Rica fought back from 3–0 down to 3–2 early in the second half, only to concede two further goals and lose 5–2. With Turkey beating China 3–0, Costa Rica finished behind Turkey on goal difference and were eliminated.

2006 World Cup
Costa Rica again managed to qualify for the World Cup finals in 2006, albeit with difficulties that saw their American coach Steve Sampson depart after they required away goals to beat Cuba in the preliminary phase. The Colombian Jorge Luis Pinto took over for the next round, which began with a disastrous 5–2 defeat at home against Honduras and a 2–1 loss in Guatemala. Costa Rica recovered with two wins over Canada and a resounding 5–0 triumph over Guatemala, when Wanchope scored a hat-trick and Carlos Hernández and Fonseca added further goals. Costa Rica advanced to the hexagonal round by winning the group.

In the final round they started with a 2–1 defeat against Mexico at the Saprissa, before beating Panama by the same score, with goals from Wayne Wilson and Roy Myrie. Pinto was dismissed after a goalless draw with Trinidad and Tobago, and Guimarães returned as coach. His first match ended in a 3–0 defeat to the United States, but wins followed against Guatemala, Panama and Trinidad and Tobago. Costa Rica decisively beat the United States in the Saprissa, 3–0, with a goal from Wanchope and two from Hernández, to guarantee their third World Cup qualification.

On 9 June 2006, Costa Rica made their debut in Munich in the opening match of the World Cup against the hosts, Germany. Wanchope scored to equalise an early goal from Philipp Lahm, and later added another, but Costa Rica lost 4–2. However, they failed to match this encouraging performance in their remaining two games, losing 3–0 against Ecuador and 2–1 against Poland in a dead rubber.

2010 World Cup
Costa Rica began the qualifying competition for the 2010 World Cup against Grenada, winning 5–2 on aggregate (2–2, 3–0). They won all six games played in the next phase, against El Salvador (1–0, 3–1), Haiti (3–1, 2–0) and Suriname (7–0, 4–1).

With two games left in the Hexagonal round, Costa Rica trailed Honduras by one point in trying to win the third automatic qualification place behind the United States and Mexico. When Honduras lost 3–2 at home to the United States, Costa Rica overtook them with a 4–0 win against Trinidad and Tobago. Needing to win the final match in Washington, D.C. against the United States to ensure qualification, the Ticos led 2–0 at half-time, but Jonathan Bornstein scored an injury-time equaliser to draw the match 2–2. Meanwhile, Honduras's 1–0 victory over El Salvador moved them into third place in the group table on goal difference.

Costa Rica finished fourth, pushing them into a play-off with the fifth-placed team from the CONMEBOL region, Uruguay. The Ticos lost the first leg in San José 1–0, after a goal by Diego Lugano, and finished with ten men after Randall Azofeifa was sent off. In the second leg, played at the Estadio Centenario in Montevideo, Sebastián Abreu put Uruguay ahead twenty minutes from time, and although Walter Centeno equalised, the 1–1 draw sent Uruguay to the World Cup finals, 2–1 on aggregate.

After failing to qualify, the team began a new era, with the young talent of players such as Azofeifa, Keylor Navas, Cristian Bolaños, Michael Barrantes and Joel Campbell. Rónald González was the interim coach before Ricardo La Volpe was appointed in September 2010. He lasted only ten months before being replaced by the Colombian, Jorge Luis Pinto, in his second spell in charge. During this period, Costa Rica played many friendlies against the top-ranked teams in the world, including the world champion Spain, most of them in the new national stadium, the Estadio Nacional, which was opened in 2011.

2014 World Cup
The Ticos' 2014 World Cup campaign began with a 2–2 draw against El Salvador in the third round of the qualifiers. They followed this with a 4–0 win over Guyana with a hat-trick by Álvaro Saborío. Two defeats to Mexico put the Ticos one defeat away from elimination, but they resurrected their campaign with a 1–0 win against El Salvador, with the only goal scored by José Miguel Cubero. They clinched a final round berth with a 7–0 win over Guyana, with goals scored by Randall Brenes, Saborío, Cristian Bolaños, Celso Borges and Cristian Gamboa.

The fourth round began with a 2–2 draw against Panama. In March, Costa Rica lost 1–0 against the United States in Denver, and launched an unsuccessful appeal against the match because of inclement weather. Costa Rica again fell 1–0 to the United States in the Gold Cup that June. Costa Rica then won 2–0 against Jamaica, beat Honduras 1–0 against, drew 0–0 at the Azteca against Mexico and won at home 2–0 against Panama. In September, they won 3–1 against the United States in San José.

On 10 September 2013, Costa Rica drew 1–1 with Jamaica, thanks to a goal from Brenes, to qualify with two games to spare. After a 1–0 loss at Honduras and 2–1 win over Mexico in October, Costa Rica finished second in the table, behind the United States.

Costa Rica were drawn in finals Group D against three previous tournament winners – Italy, England and Uruguay – and were given odds of 2500–1 to win the tournament. However, they beat Uruguay and Italy and drew 0–0 with England to finish top of the group and qualify for the knockout stage.

In the second round, they beat Greece 5–3 on penalties after a 1–1 draw, seeing them through to the quarter-finals for the first time. There, they held the Netherlands to a 0–0 draw after extra time, before losing 4–3 on penalties. Costa Rica rose 12 places to 16th in the FIFA World Rankings. Former player Rónald González cited their long-term progress since 2007 as the reason for their achievement.

2018 World Cup
The Ticos' qualification for the 2018 World Cup started with a bye to the fourth qualifying round, where they won five games and drew one, winning their group. In the final round, they finished second behind Mexico to qualify automatically, winning four matches, drawing four and losing two.

Costa Rica were drawn in Group E alongside Brazil, Switzerland and Serbia. Many key players from 2014 tournament remained in the squad, but they made a disappointing exit at the group stage. Costa Rica lost their first two games, against Serbia and Brazil, without scoring, but drew 2–2 with Switzerland in their last match after equalising in injury time.

2022 World Cup
The Ticos' qualification for the 2022 World Cup started with a bye to the final qualifying round, they finished fourth behind United States to advance to inter-confederation play-offs winning seven matches, drawing four and losing three. In the inter-confederation play-offs in Al Rayyan, Costa Rica won the match 1–0 against New Zealand and qualified for the World Cup.

On November 23, 2022, Costa Rica lost 7–0 against Spain becoming the biggest loss in World Cup history since 2010. This match also tied for their worst defeat in professional football with a match against Mexico, which ended with the result Mexico 7–0 Costa Rica (Mexico City, Mexico; 17 August 1975). Despite an improvement from beating Japan and initially make a little justice of scoring 2 goals from losing a goal of Germany in the first half, the latter scored 3 goals and thrashed Costa Rica’s qualification to Round of 16 hope.

Home stadium
Estadio Nacional is the home stadium of the Costa Rica national team since its opening on 10 January 2011, after a short construction that took only 22 months. This venue hosts their friendly matches as well as the World Cup qualifying matches against CONCACAF rivals. Before the construction of the stadium the matches where played in Estadio Ricardo Saprissa or in Estadio Alejandro Morera Soto.

Team image
Costa Rica wears traditionally a red jersey with blue shorts and white socks. Their away kit historically was a Juventus-style black and white striped jersey with white shorts and white or black socks, due to these colors being the ones of CS La Libertad, one of the oldest clubs in Costa Rica. However, after 1997, the striped kit was replaced by a white kit. In 2015, Boston based sportswear company New Balance became the provider of the national team, after taking over for Italian company Lotto. Since 2023, Adidas is the kit provider for the national team.

Kit sponsorship

Results and fixtures

The following is a list of match results in the last 12 months, as well as any future matches that have been scheduled.

2022

2023

Coaching staff

Coaching history
Caretaker managers are listed in italics.

  Eladio Rosabal Cordero (1921)
  Manolo Rodríguez (1930)
  Ricardo Saprissa (1935–1938)
  Alejandro Morera Soto (1941, 1943)
  Jorge Rojas (1943)
  Hernán Bolaños (1946); (1948)
  Randolph Galloway &  Hernán Bolaños (1946)
  Santiago Bonilla (1950)
  Ismael Quesada (1951)
  Ricardo Saprissa &  Luis Cartín Paniagua (1951)
  Otto Bumbel (1953)
  Alfredo Piedra (1955–1957)
  Rubén Amorín (1960)
  Hugo Tassara (1960)
  Eduardo Toba Muíño (1961)
  Alfredo Piedra (1961–1963)
  Eduardo Viso Abella,  Alfredo Piedra, &  Mario "Catato" Cordero (1965)
  Rodolfo Ulloa Antillón (1967–1968)
  Américo Brunner (1968)
  Rogelio Rojas (1969)
  Marvin Rodríguez (1969, 1971, 1975, 1989–1990, 1999–2000)
  Eduardo Viso Abella (1970)
  Humberto Maschio (1972)
  José Etchegoyen (1975)
  Juan José Gámez (1976)
  Antonio Moyano (1979–1980, 1983–1984, 1994)
  Ivan Mráz (1980)
  Odir Jacques (1985)
  Álvaro Grant MacDonald (1985, 1993)
  Gustavo De Simone (1987–1989)
  Antonio Moyano &  Marvin Rodríguez (1989)
  Bora Milutinović (1990)
  Rolando Villalobos (1991, 1998)
  Héctor Núñez (1992)
  Juan José Gámez (1993)
  Juan Luis Hernández Fuertes (1993–1994)
  Toribio Rojas (1994–1995)
  Juan Blanco (1995)
  Valdeir Vieira (1996)
  Horacio Cordero (1997)
  Juan Luis Hernández Fuertes (1997)
  Francisco Maturana (1998–1999)
  Gílson Nunes (2000)
  Alexandre Guimarães (2001–2002, 2005–2006)
  Rodrigo Kenton (2002)
  Steve Sampson (2003–2004)
  Jorge Luis Pinto (2004–2005, 2011–2014)
  Carlos Watson (2006)
  Hernán Medford (2007–2008)
  Rodrigo Kenton (2008–2009)
  Renê Simões (2009)
  Rónald González (2010)
  Ricardo La Volpe (2010–2011)
  Paulo Wanchope (2014–2015)
  Óscar Ramírez (2015–2018)
  Rónald González Brenes (2018)
  Gustavo Matosas (2018–2019)
  Douglas Sequeira (2019)
  Rónald González Brenes (2019–2021)
  Luis Fernando Suárez (2021–present)

Players

Current squad
The following 26 players were called up for the 2022–23 CONCACAF Nations League A match against Panama on 28 March 2023.

Caps and goals as of 1 December 2022, after the match against Germany.

Recent call-ups
The following players have been called up within the last twelve months.

INJ Withdrew due to injury.
RET Retired from international football.
ILL Withdrew due to illness.
PRE Preliminary squad.
WD Withdrew for personal reasons.

Records

Players in bold are still active with Costa Rica.

Most appearances

Top goalscorers

Competitive record

FIFA World Cup

*Draws include knockout matches decided via penalty shoot-out.

CONCACAF Gold Cup

CONCACAF Nations League

Copa América

*Ecuador 1993 was the first time nations from outside CONMEBOL were invited.

Copa Centroamericana

CCCF Championship

Olympic Games

Pan American Games

Panamerican Championship

Head-to-head record

The following table shows Costa Rica's all-time international record, correct as of 2 February 2022.

Honours
Major competitions

FIFA World Cup
 Quarter-finals (1): 2014
CONCACAF Championship / Gold Cup
 Champions (3): 1963, 1969, 1989
 Runners-up (1): 2002
 Third place (4): 1965, 1971, 1985, 1993

Other competitions

Panamerican Championship
 Third place (1): 1956
Central American and Caribbean Games
 Runners-up (3): 1930, 1935, 1938
CONCACAF Olympic Qualifying Tournament
 Champions (2): 1980, 1984
Copa Centroamericana
 Champions (8): 1991, 1997, 1999, 2003, 2005, 2007, 2013, 2014
 Runners-up (4): 1993, 2001, 2009, 2011
CCCF Championship
 Champions (7): 1941, 1946, 1948, 1953, 1955, 1960, 1961
 Runners-up (1): 1951
 Third place (1): 1943
 Independence Centenary Games
 Champions (1): 1921

Facts
 Costa Rica was the first (and so far the only) Central American football team to win a game at a FIFA World Cup tournament.
 Costa Rica finished in first place in the 1990 and 2002 FIFA World Cup qualification final rounds, the latter of which was the best group record in the history of the CONCACAF hexagonal (23 points).
 Costa Rica (in 2014) is one of two Central American or Caribbean teams (along with Cuba in 1938) to ever to advance to the quarter-finals of the FIFA World Cup.

FIFA World Ranking

Last update was on 27 May 2021
Source:

 Best Ranking   Worst Ranking   Best Mover   Worst Mover

See also

 Costa Rica national under-23 football team
 Costa Rica national under-20 football team
 Costa Rica national under-17 football team
 Costa Rica at the FIFA World Cup

References

External links

FEDEFUTBOL.com – Website of the Costa Rican Football Federation
Costa Rica FIFA profile
1921 to 2009 Costa Rica match results by Marcos Romero at RSSSF

 
Central American national association football teams